Proctoporus carabaya is a species of lizard in the family Gymnophthalmidae. It is endemic to Peru.

References

Proctoporus
Reptiles of Peru
Endemic fauna of Peru
Reptiles described in 2013
Taxa named by Noemí Goicoechea
Taxa named by José Manuel Padial
Taxa named by Juan Carlos Chaparro
Taxa named by Santiago Castroviejo-Fisher
Taxa named by Ignacio J. De la Riva